at-Tabaqa is a Palestinian village located seven kilometers west of Hebron. The town is in the Hebron Governorate Southern West Bank. According to the Palestinian Central Bureau of Statistics, the village had a population of 1,435 in mid-year 2006.

Footnotes

External links
Welcome To Kh. al-Tabaqa
At Tabaqa & Wadih Village (fact sheet), Applied Research Institute–Jerusalem, ARIJ
At Tabaqa & Wadih village profile, ARIJ
 At Tabaqa aerial photo, ARIJ
The priorities and needs for development in At Tabaqa & Wadih village based on the community and local authorities' assessment, ARIJ

Villages in the West Bank
Hebron Governorate
Municipalities of the State of Palestine